Strojec  is a village in the administrative district of Gmina Praszka, within Olesno County, Opole Voivodeship, in south-western Poland.

The village has an approximate population of 1,100.

References

Strojec